Aedes (Aedimorphus) pallidostriatus is a species complex of zoophilic mosquito belonging to the genus Aedes. It is found in Sri Lanka, Bangladesh, Malaysia, Thailand, India and Western Pakistan.

References

External links
Aedes pallidostriatus (mosquito) - The Ecological Register
Bio-variability of mosquitoes in an agro-ecosystem of Jameen Salvarpatti 
Morphology and Morphometry of Aedes aegypti Adult Mosquito
GENUS AEDES. SUBGENUS AEDIMORPHUS THEOBALD ~~ IN SOUTHEAST ASIA

pallidostriatus